Highway 213 (AR 213, Ark. 213, and Hwy. 213) is a state highway in Conway County, Arkansas. The highway of  runs north from Highway 95 to Highway 124.

Route description
Highway 213 begins in western Conway County on Highway 95 north of Morrilton and south of the Ozark National Forest. The highway runs northwest to Hattieville where it serves as the southern terminus for Highway 247. Following this junction, the highway turns north, running to Old Hickory before terminating at Highway 124. No segment of the highway is listed on the National Highway System, a network of roads important to the country's economy, defense, and mobility.

History
The highway was created by the Arkansas State Highway Commission on July 10, 1957. The route has not seen any changes in alignment since designation.

Major intersections

See also

References

213
Transportation in Conway County, Arkansas